The Nordfjord Opera house (Norwegian: Operahuset Nordfjord) is the home of Opera Nordfjord and is the second opera house in Norway. The building is situated in the town center of Nordfjordeid in Western Norway, north of the Sagastad Viking Center. It is operated by Vestland County Municipality and Stad Municipality. The building also houses Eid Upper Secondary School. The structure is 9,132 m2 (98,296.03 sq ft). The main auditorium seats 530 while the cinema seats 105. The main stage is 14 m (46 ft) wide and 10 m (33 ft) deep.

History 
In 1997 the idea of a regional opera arose for the first time in Nordfjordeid. In 1998 the local Opera company known as Opera Nordfjord was formed as an initiative by the married couple Kari Standal Pavelich (Director) and Michael Pavelich (Conductor). The first production was Die Fledermaus in 1998. As a result of the regional opera successes there was a need for an Opera house in the town, and a collaboration project with Eid Upper Secondary School was established. The school wanted to co-locate the vocational department with its general studies department, and the Opera required a building for its productions.

The Opera house project went through several iterations over many years, and ended up being funded by private investors (2,5 mill), Eid Municipality (45,5 mill), Sogn og Fjordane County Municipality (118 mill), and the Norwegian Government (17 mill).  Construction started in April 2007 with a budget of 135 million NOK. The total costs ended up being 183 million NOK.

The construction of the building was finished on March 1. 2009. The building was officially opened by the Minister of Culture; Trond Giske on the 25th of April 2009. In October 2009 HM Queen Sonja attended the premiere of the first Opera Carmen to be held in the new building. The Queen also opened the "Opera-week" in Nordfjordeid. In 2018 Kari and Michael Pavelich were awarded a royal distinction, the King's Medal of Merit for their 20 years of work and commitment connected to Opera and culture in Nordfjordeid.

The building 
The building is a combination of an Opera house and school. The western part of the building is exclusively for educational purposes, with almost 400 students and 90 educational staff during the day. The eastern part of the building houses the main theatre, library, cinema and several conference rooms, offices and the foyer lobby.

Main theater 
The main theatre includes a gallery, stage, orchestra pit, 5 dressing rooms, toilets and showers. The maximum occupancy is 550, including 6 handicap spots. 218 of the seats are located in the gallery. When the orchestra pit is in use the total occupancy is reduced to 484 seats. The main stage is 14 meters wide, 10 meters deep, and the height is 12 meters. The theatre features advanced acoustics that can be adjusted dependent on production requirements. The chamber is specially constructed and adapted for acoustic music, using the same techniques as found in the Operahouse in Oslo.

There are reflective surfaces in the ceiling and walls of hard boards as well as the possibility of dampening reverberation with carpets in the ceiling and on the back wall, which are curved and broken up. Some sound absorption has been added to capture the bass in low-frequency pop and rock. Many of the stage textiles are in sound-reflecting material. It is also possible to lower sound reflectors that form a kind of stage house above the orchestra. This improves the possibility of interaction on stage and provides more sound in the chamber.

Cinema 
The cinema has an occupancy capacity of 105 seats, including 6 handicap spots. It is used as the main cinema in Nordfjordeid, with several movie viewings offered per week.

Foyer 
The foyer is used as the main lobby during productions. It has a seating capacity of approximately 300 people for gala events and dinners. During the day time it acts as a cantina for the students at the upper secondary school. The foyer also hosts art exhibitions and conferences.

Library 
The library is located next to the southern entrance of the building on the ground floor. It is operated by Stad Municipality, and is open all year. The library offers books, audio books, newspapers, DVDs and video games. The library also hosts cultural events, visits from authors and smaller concerts.

Productions and performances 
Throughout each year since the opening of the Opera House there has been a varied lineup of performances in the building. Including Musicals, Operas, Operettas, Rock concerts, Stand-up comedy, Jazz, Ballet, and dance shows.

Opera Productions by Opera Nordfjord 
Opera Nordfjord has held 14 unique productions in the Opera House since 2009. Prior performances where held in the Nordfjord Folk-High School.

School Musicals 
The Eid Upper Secondary school sets up a musical performance annually in cooperation with Opera Nordfjord.

References 

Opera houses in Norway